The McDonnell Douglas F-15 Eagle has been in service with the United States Air Force since 1976. Israel, Japan, Saudi Arabia and other nations also operate the aircraft.  The units it has been assigned to, and the bases it has been stationed are listed below.

Operators

The Israeli Air Force has operated F-15s since 1977, received under Peace Fox I, II and III. These aircraft are currently organized into two F-15A/B/C/D squadrons and one F-15I squadron. The first 25 F-15A/Bs were early USAF production airframes. The second batch was temporarily embargoed as a result of the 1982 Lebanon War. The IAF has 43 F-15A/B/C/D (20 F-15A, 6 F-15B, 11 F-15C, and 6 F-15D) aircraft in service as of January 2011. It also operates 25 F-15I "Ra'am" aircraft as of January 2011.
106 Squadron ("The Head of the Spear Squadron") Tel Nof Airbase (F-15A/B/C/D)
133 Squadron ("The Twin-Tail Knights Squadron") Tel Nof Airbase (F-15A/B/C/D)
69 Squadron – Hatzerim AFB (F-15I)

The Japan Air Self-Defense Force operates Mitsubishi F-15J and F-15DJ fighters.  It had 157 F-15Js and 45 F-15DJs in use as of November 2008.
 2nd Air Wing Chitose Air Base
 201st Tactical Fighter Squadron
 203rd Tactical Fighter Squadron
 6th Air Wing Komatsu Air Base
 303rd Tactical Fighter Squadron
 306th Tactical Fighter Squadron
 5th Air Wing Nyutabaru Air Base
 305th Tactical Fighter Squadron
 9th Air Wing Naha Air Base
 204th Tactical Fighter Squadron
 304th Tactical Fighter Squadron
 Air Development and Test Wing
 23rd Flying Training Squadron

Republic of Korea Air Force received 61 F-15K "Slam Eagle" with two being lost in accidents. It has 59 F-15Ks in use.
11th Fighter Wing (제11전투비행단), based at Daegu
 102nd Fighter Squadron
 122nd Fighter Squadron
 110th Fighter Squadron

Both the 102nd Fighter Squadron and the 122nd Fighter Squadron operate the batch-1 of F-15Ks (integrated with F110-GE-129A) while the 110th Fighter Squadron operating the batch-2 of F-15Ks (integrated with F100-P&W-229EPE).

Qatar Emiri Air Force has ordered 36 F-15QA "Ababil" variants. Eight delivered as of December 2021.
Flying Wing 5 – Al Udeid Air Base
51st Squadron

Royal Saudi Air Force has operated 4 squadrons of F-15C/D (55/19) since 1981, received under Peace Sun after requesting the planes in 1977. They are based at Dhahran, Khamis Mushayt and Taif air bases. A stipulation in the Camp David Peace Agreement limited the number of Saudi F-15 to 60, holding surplus air frames in Luke AFB for RSAF pilot training. This limitation was later abandoned. The RSAF has 70 F-15C/D (49 F-15C and 21 F-15D) fighters along with 69 F-15S fighters in operation as of January 2011.
No. 2 Wing RSAF – King Abdulaziz Air Base 
No. 5 Squadron RSAF (F-15C/D)
No. 34 Squadron RSAF (F-15C/D)
No. 3 Wing RSAF – King Abdulaziz Air Base
No. 13 Squadron RSAF (F-15C/D)
No. 92 Squadron RSAF (F-15S)
No. 5 Wing RSAF – King Khalid Air Base
No. 6 Squadron RSAF (F-15S)
No. 55 Squadron RSAF (F-15S)
No. 7 Wing RSAF – King Faisal Air Base
No. 2 Squadron RSAF (F-15C/D)

Republic of Singapore Air Force (RSAF) operates 40 F-15SG
142 Squadron "Gryphon"
149 Squadron "Fighting Shikra"

NASA currently operates one F-15B #836 as a test bed for a variety of flight research experiments and two F-15D, #884 and #897, for research support and pilot proficiency. All three F-15s are stationed at NASA's Armstrong Flight Research Center.
United States Air Force operated 254 F-15C/D aircraft (222 in the active Air Force and 32 in the ANG) as of September 2010.  Bold type below indicates Air Force units (Active, ANG and AFRC) operating F-15s in January 2012.   In addition the USAF also operates 219 F-15E variants as of September 2016.
Active units
Air Combat Command
1st Fighter Wing – Langley AFB, Virginia
27th Fighter Squadron (Converted to F-22 in 2005)
71st Fighter Squadron (Reactivated as 71st Fighter Training Squadron flying the T-38 in 2015)
94th Fighter Squadron (Converted to F-22 in 2005)
4th Fighter Wing – Seymour Johnson AFB, North Carolina
333d Fighter Squadron (F-15E)
334th Fighter Squadron (F-15E)
335th Fighter Squadron (F-15E)
336th Fighter Squadron (F-15E)
33d Fighter Wing – Eglin AFB, Florida
58th Fighter Squadron (Converted to F-35 in 2009)
59th Fighter Squadron (Reassigned to 53d Wing as 59th Test and Evaluation Squadron)
60th Fighter Squadron (Inactivated in 2009; reactivated flying the Lockheed-Martin F-35A in 2021)
49th Fighter Wing – Holloman AFB, New Mexico
7th Fighter Squadron (Converted to F-22 in 2008)
8th Fighter Squadron (Converted to F-22 in 2009)
9th Fighter Squadron (Reactivated as 9th Attack Squadron flying the MQ-9 in 2012)
53d Wing – Eglin Air Force Base, Florida
85th Test and Evaluation Squadron (F-15C, F-15E)
422d Test and Evaluation Squadron, Nellis AFB, Nevada (ceased flying the F-15C in 2021, still flying the F-15E)
57th Wing – Nellis AFB, Nevada
17th Weapons Squadron (F-15E)
65th Aggressor Squadron (Inactivated in 2014)
433d Weapons Squadron (ceased flying the F-15C in 2021, still flying the F-22)
366th Fighter Wing – Mountain Home AFB, Idaho (F-15C/D units inactivated; F-15E units retained)
389th Fighter Squadron (F-15E)
390th Fighter Squadron (Reactivated as 390th Electronic Combat Squadron flying the EA-18 in 2010)
391st Fighter Squadron (F-15E)
428th Fighter Squadron mixed USAF/RSAF unit for training RSAF personnel on the new F-15SG (Peace Carvin V)
379th Air Expeditionary Wing (F-15E)
455th Air Expeditionary Wing – Bagram AB, Afghanistan (F-15E)
Air Education and Training Command
173rd Fighter Wing – Kingsley Field Air National Guard Base, Oregon
550th Fighter Squadron (F-15E, inactivated 1991, Reactivated 1994–1995.  Reactivated 2017 flying the F-15C/D)
325th Fighter Wing – Tyndall AFB, Florida
1st Fighter Squadron (Inactivated in 2006)
2d Fighter Squadron (Reactivated as 2nd Fighter Training Squadron flying the T-38 in 2014)
95th Fighter Squadron (Converted to F-22 in 2014)
405th Tactical Training Wing / 58th Fighter Wing / 56th Fighter Wing – Luke AFB, Arizona
426th Tactical Fighter Training Squadron (former F-15 C/D, inactivated 1990)
461st Fighter Squadron (F-15E, Reactivated as 461st Flight Test Squadron flying the F-35 in 2006)
555th Fighter Squadron (F-15E, Transferred to Aviano AB, Italy flying the F-16C in 1994)
Pacific Air Forces
3d Wing – Elmendorf AFB, Alaska
12th Fighter Squadron (Reassigned to 27th Special Operations Wing as 12th Special Operations Squadron)
19th Fighter Squadron (Converted to F-22 in 2010)
43d Fighter Squadron (Converted to F-22 in 2002)
54th Fighter Squadron (Inactivated in 2000)
90th Fighter Squadron (F-15E, converted to F-22 in 2007)
18th Wing – Kadena AB, Japan
12th Fighter Squadron
44th Fighter Squadron
67th Fighter Squadron
United States Air Forces in Europe
32d Fighter Squadron – Soesterberg AB, Netherlands (former operator, base closed, squadron inactivated)
32d Fighter Squadron 
36th Fighter Wing – Bitburg AB, Germany
22d Fighter Squadron (Transferred to Spangdalem AB in 1994 and converted to F-16CJ until 2010, squadron inactivated)
53d Fighter Squadron (Transferred to Spangdalem AB, 1994) 
525th Tactical Fighter Squadron (Inactivated 1992, Reactivated 2007 flying the F-22)
48th Fighter Wing – RAF Lakenheath, UK (ceased flying the F-15C in 2022, still flying the F-15E)
492d Fighter Squadron (F-15E)
493d Fighter Squadron (Converted to F-35A in 2022)
494th Fighter Squadron (F-15E)
52d Fighter Wing – Spangdahlem AB, Germany
53d Fighter Squadron (Transferred from Bitburg AB, 1994, Inactivated 1999)
Air Defense – Tactical Air Command (ADTAC)
5th Fighter-Interceptor Squadron – Minot AFB, North Dakota
48th Fighter-Interceptor Squadron – Langley AFB, Virginia
57th Fighter-Interceptor Squadron – NAS Keflavik, Iceland
318th Fighter-Interceptor Squadron – McChord AFB, Washington
Air Force Materiel Command
46th Test Wing / 96th Test Wing – Eglin AFB
40th Flight Test Squadron (F-15E)
412th Test Wing – Edwards AFB, California
415th Flight Test Squadron (F-15E)
419th Flight Test Squadron (F-15C/D, F-15E)
Air Force Reserve
Air Force Reserve Command
414th Fighter Group – Seymour Johnson AFB, North Carolina
307th Fighter Squadron (F-15E)
Air National Guard
Florida Air National Guard
125th Fighter Wing – Jacksonville ANGB
159th Fighter Squadron
California Air National Guard 
144th Fighter Wing – Fresno ANGB/March ARB
194th Fighter Squadron 
Hawaii Air National Guard 
154th Wing – Hickam AFB
199th Fighter Squadron (Converted to F-22 associate unit in 2010)
Louisiana Air National Guard
159th Fighter Wing – NAS/JRB New Orleans
122d Fighter Squadron
Massachusetts Air National Guard
102nd Fighter Wing – Otis ANGB
101st Fighter Squadron (Lost F-15s in 2007 due to BRAC 2005. Now a non-flying Intelligence squadron.)
104th Fighter Wing – Barnes ANGB
131st Fighter Squadron
Missouri Air National Guard
131st Fighter Wing – Lambert-St. Louis International Airport
110th Fighter Squadron (Converted to B-2 associate unit and moved to Whiteman AFB in 2008)
Montana Air National Guard
120th Fighter Wing – Great Falls International Airport/Great Falls ANGB - last F-15s departed in October 2013.
186th Fighter Squadron (Reactivated as 186th Airlift Squadron flying the C-130)
Oregon Air National Guard
142d Fighter Wing – Portland International Airport/Portland ANGS
123d Fighter Squadron
173d Fighter Wing – Kingsley Field ANGB
114th Fighter Squadron

References
Citations

Bibliography

 Aloni, Shlomo. Israeli F-15 Eagle Units in Combat (Osprey Combat Aircraft #67). Oxford, UK: Osprey Publishing Limited, 2006. .
 Davies, Steve. Boeing F-15E Strike Eagle, All-Weather Attack Aircraft, London: Airlife Publishing, Ltd., 2003. .
 Davies, Steve. Combat Legend, F-15 Eagle and Strike Eagle. London: Airlife Publishing, Ltd., 2002. .
 Davies, Steve. F-15C/E Eagle Units of operation Iraqi Freedom (Osprey Combat Aircraft #47). Oxford, UK: Osprey Publishing Limited, 2004. .
 Davies, Steve and Doug Dildy. F-15 Eagle Engaged, The World's Most Successful Jet Fighter. Oxford, UK: Osprey Publishing Limited, 2007. .
 Gething, Michael J. F-15 Eagle (Modern Fighting Aircraft). New York: Arco, 1983. .
 Jenkins, Dennis R. McDonnell Douglas F-15 Eagle, Supreme Heavy-Weight Fighter. Hinckley, UK: Midland Publishing, 1998. .
 Lambert, Mark, ed. Jane's All the World's Aircraft 1993–94. Alexandria, Virginia: Jane's Information Group Inc., 1993. .
 Spick, Mike, ed. The Great Book of Modern Warplanes. St. Paul Minnesota: MBI, 2000. .

F-15 Eagle
F-15 Eagle
F-015 Eagle
F-015